The 1985 Cork Junior A Football Championship was the 87th staging of the Cork Junior A Football Championship since its establishment by Cork County Board in 1895. The championship ran from  29 September to 24 November 1985.

The final replay was played on 24 November 1985 at Páirc Uí Chaoimh in Cork, between Kilshannig and Valley Rovers, in what was their first ever meeting in the final. Kilshannig won the match by 2-06 to 2-04 to claim their first ever championship title.

P. J. Hurley was the championship's top scorer with 2-08.

Qualification

Results

Quarter-finals

Semi-finals

Final

Championship statistics

Top scorers

Overall

In a single game

References

1985 in Irish sport
Cork Junior Football Championship